Khosrowabad (also Romanized as Khosrowābād) is a village in Dorud Rural District, in the Central District of Dorud County, Lorestan Province, Iran. At the 2006 census, its population was 543, in 110 families.

References 

Towns and villages in Dorud County